Cymbidiella, abbreviated as Cymla in horticultural trade, is a genus of 3 species of epiphytic orchids native to the moist forests of Madagascar.

References

External links

Orchids of Madagascar
Eulophiinae genera
Eulophiinae